The Second Roman cabinet was the government of Romania from 28 June 1990 through 30 April 1991, led by Prime Minister Petre Roman. It was a single-party majority cabinet; it was formed only by the party that won the elections with 66% of the vote, the National Salvation Front (Frontul Salvării Naționale, FSN). The cabinet included a few independents.

Members
Single-party majority cabinet (FSN, Frontul Salvării Naționale, National Salvation Front), plus independents.

Prime Minister: 
Petre Roman

Ministers of State:
Anton Vătășescu (Co-ordinating Industrial and Commercial Activity)
Eugen Dijmărescu (Co-ordinating Economic Orientation)
Ion Aurel Stoica/Dan Mircea Popescu (Co-ordinating Quality of Life)

Ministers:
Victor Babiuc (Justice)
Theodor Stolojan (Finance)
Victor Athanasie Stănculescu (Defense)
Andrei Pleșu (Culture and Arts)
Ioan Țipu (Agriculture)
Adrian Năstase (Foreign Affairs)
Eugen Dijmărescu (Economy)
Doru Pană (Public Works)
Doru Viorel Ursu (Interior)
Gheorghe Ştefan (Education)
Valeriu Eugen Pop (Environment)
Cătălin Zamfir (Labor)
Traian Băsescu (Transport)
Bogdan Marinescu (Health)
Andrei Chirică (Communication)
Mihai Zisu (Resources and Industry)
Constantin Fota (Commerce and Tourism)
Bogdan Niculescu-Duvăz (Youth and Sport)

Roman II Cabinet
1990 establishments in Romania
1991 disestablishments in Romania
Cabinets established in 1990
Cabinets disestablished in 1991